Samuli Kalevi Samuelsson (born 23 June 1995 in Ikaalinen) is a Finnish athlete competing in sprinting events. He won a bronze medal at the 2017 European U23 Championships in Bydgoszcz. He is the national record holder in 100 meters.

International competitions

1Disqualified in the semifinals

Personal bests

Outdoor
100 metres – 10.16 (Porvoo 2022)
200 metres – 20.73 (Seinäjoki 2017)
Indoor
60 metres – 6.64 (Aarhus 2022)
200 metres – 21.25 (Helsinki 2022)

References

1995 births
Living people
Finnish male sprinters
People from Ikaalinen
Competitors at the 2017 Summer Universiade
Sportspeople from Pirkanmaa